Helicops petersi, the spiral keelback, is a species of snake in the family Colubridae. It is found in Ecuador.

References 

Helicops]
Snakes of South America
Reptiles of Ecuador
Endemic fauna of Ecuador
Reptiles described in 1976
Taxa named by Douglas A. Rossman